United School District may refer to:
United School District (Pennsylvania)
United Community Unit School District #304 in Illinois